Kafr Qallil is a Palestinian town in the Nablus Governorate of the State of Palestine, in the northern West Bank. According to the Palestinian Central Bureau of Statistics (PCBS), the town had a population of 2,491 inhabitants in mid-year 2006.

Location
Kafr Qallil is located 4.30 km south of Nablus. It is bordered by Nablus to the north and east, and by Burin to the south and west.

History
Pottery sherds from the early and late Roman and Byzantine eras have been found here. In addition to ceramics, inscriptions dating to the Byzantine era have been found here. This place was mentioned in the Samaritan Chronicle, and was inhabited by the Samaritans in the 7th century CE.

Pottery from the Umayyad era has also been found here.

Ottoman era
Incorporated into the Ottoman Empire in 1517 with the rest of Palestine, in  1596 the village appeared in Ottoman   tax registers as being in the nahiya of Jabal Qubal, part of Nablus Sanjak. It had a population of 50 households and 11 bachelors, all Muslim. They paid a fixed tax-rate of 33.3% on agricultural products, including wheat, barley,  summer crops, olive trees, goats and beehives, in addition to occasional revenues and a press for olive oil or syrup; a total of 15,000 akçe.

In 1838, Kefr Kullin was noted as a village on the side of Mount Gerizim,  located in the District of Jurat 'Amra, south of Nablus.

In 1870, Victor Guérin described it as being a village of two hundred inhabitants, separated by a valley in two districts, one northern and the other southern. A few gardens adjoined it.

In 1882, the PEF's Survey of Western Palestine described Kefr Kullin as "A small village at the foot of Gerizim, with a spring in it; it stands higher than the main road."

British Mandate era
In the 1922 census of Palestine conducted by the British Mandate authorities, Kufr Qallil had a population of 298 Muslims, increasing at the time of the 1931 census to 332, still all  Muslim, in 79 houses.

In the 1945 statistics, Kafr Qallil (including Khirbat Sarin) had a population of 470, all Muslims,  with 4,732 dunams of land, according to an official land and population survey. Of this, 83 dunams were plantations and irrigable land, 2,397 were used for cereals, while 39 dunams were built-up (urban) land.

Jordanian era
In the wake of the 1948 Arab–Israeli War, and after the 1949 Armistice Agreements, Kafr Qallil came under Jordanian  rule. 

The Jordanian census of 1961 found 749 inhabitants here.

1967, aftermath
Since the Six-Day War in 1967, Kafr Qallil has been under Israeli occupation.

After the 1995 Accords, 27% of the village land was classified as Area A, the remaining 73% as Area C.

Israel has confiscated hundreds of dunams of land from the village. Some has been used for Israeli military checkpoints, and 15 dunams went to the Israeli settlement of Har Brakha.

References

Bibliography

External links
 Welcome to Kafr Qallil
Survey of Western Palestine, Map 11:    IAA, Wikimedia commons
  Kafr Qallil Village Profile,  Applied Research Institute–Jerusalem (ARIJ)
 Kafr Qallil, aerial photo, ARIJ
 Development Priorities and Needs in Kafr Qallil, ARIJ

Nablus Governorate
Villages in the West Bank
Municipalities of the State of Palestine
Ancient Samaritan settlements